Soliai Letutusa is a Samoan footballer who plays as a midfielder or forward for Lupe ole Soaga in the Samoa National League and the Samoa national football team.

References

Living people
1996 births
Samoan footballers
Association football midfielders
Sportspeople from Apia
Samoa international footballers
Samoa youth international footballers